The North Wales Mineral Railway was constructed in Wales in 1844, during the early years of the Railway Mania. It was originally intended to link Chester via Wrexham to the industrial areas around Ruabon; there were branches to Brymbo and Minera from Wheatsheaf junction via a tunnel and inclined plane. The initial plan (as indicated by the name) was to tap the mineral reserves of the area.

Shrewsbury and Chester Railway

With the realisation that it could become part of a through route, a second Act of Parliament was sought in 1845 to extend the line southwards to Shrewsbury: the title of the line then became the Shrewsbury and Chester Railway (S&CR). in 1854 the railway was taken over by the Great Western Railway (GWR), much to the consternation of the London and North Western Railway, who saw the line as being within their sphere of influence. There followed much legal wrangling and hostility concerning access agreements to Chester railway station; but this did not prevent the line becoming part of the G.W.R. main line to Birkenhead.

Track gauge
Although part of the GWR, the S&CR was never converted to Brunel's Broad Gauge;  but it did contribute to the ending of the Brunel system because it meant that the company had to operate two different systems and tranship goods.

Rolling stock
The S&CR rolling stock was overhauled at Wolverhampton railway works.

The line today
The line now forms part of the Shrewsbury to Chester Line.

References

For more information on the intensive workings of railways in the Wrexham area, see:
 Forgotten Railways-North and Mid Wales, by Rex Christiansen (David & Charles, 1984)
 Wrexham's Railways volumes 1 and 2 (Bridge Books)

Early Welsh railway companies
Railway lines opened in 1844
Railway companies established in 1844
British companies established in 1844
Railway companies disestablished in 1854
Standard gauge railways in Wales
Great Western Railway constituents
1844 establishments in Wales
British companies disestablished in 1854